Mamidanna Satyaratna Ramachandra Rao (born on 7 August 1966) is an Indian Judge. Presently, he is Judge of Punjab and Haryana High Court. He is former Judge of Telangana High Court. He has also served as Acting Chief Justice of Telangana High Court.

Career 
Born on 7 August 1966 at Hyderabad, he passed law from Osmania University in 1989. On 7 September 1989 he was enrolled as an Advocate. He practiced in Civil Law, Arbitration, Company Law, Administrative and Constitutional Law, Labour and Service Law. He was elevated as an Additional Judge of Andhra Pradesh High Court on 29 June 2012 and made permanent on 4 December 2013. He took over as Acting Chief Justice of Telangana High Court on 31 August 2021 consequent upon the appointment of Justice Hima Kohli, Chief Justice of Telangana High Court as a Judge of Supreme Court of India. He was transferred as Judge of Punjab and Haryana High Court on 5 October 2021 and took oath on 12 October 2021.

References 

Chief Justices of the Telangana High Court
Living people
1966 births
Judges of the Punjab and Haryana High Court
Judges of the Andhra Pradesh High Court
Judges of the Telangana High Court